Karamyshevo is a rural locality (a selo) and the administrative center of Karamyshevsky Selsoviet, Zmeinogorsky District, Altai Krai, Russia. The population was 1,126 as of 2013. There are 23 streets.

Geography 
Karamyshevo is located 8 km west of Zmeinogorsk (the district's administrative centre) by road. Voronezh and Zmeinogorsk are the nearest rural localities.

References 

Rural localities in Zmeinogorsky District